WCGM (102.7 FM) is a radio station broadcasting a Christian format. Licensed to serve Wattsburg, Pennsylvania, the station operates as an affiliate of Family Life Network, and primarily plays contemporary Christian music, with some Christian talk and teaching programs. It is owned by Family Life Ministries.

History
WCGM previously held the callsign WNAE-FM, aired a country music format, and was temporarily a simulcast of sister station WKNB. At this time the station was licensed to Clarendon, Pennsylvania, United States, and was owned by Frank Iorio under his holding company Iorio Broadcasting, Inc. In 2010, WNAE-FM was sold to Family Life Ministries, with the intention of moving the station from Clarendon to Wattsburg. The call sign was changed to WCGM on June 15, 2011, swapping with a Family Life-owned construction permit in Belfast, New York; the relocated WCGM relaunched as a Family Life Network station in October 2011.

References

External links

CGM
Radio stations established in 2007
2007 establishments in Pennsylvania